Roger Säljö (born 2 April 1948) is a Swedish educational psychologist whose research presents a socio-cultural perspective on human learning and development. Säljö is a professor of education and educational psychology at Göteborg University and was president of the European Association for Research on Learning and Instruction (EARLI) between 2005 and 2007. Roger Säljö is the director of a national centre of excellence in research. In 2012, Roger Säljö co-founded the academic journal Learning, Culture and Social Interaction.

See also
Ference Marton

References

External links
 Publications
 European Association for Research on Learning and Instruction

Educational psychologists
Academic staff of the University of Gothenburg
1948 births
Living people